The president of India is the head of state of the Republic of India and the Supreme Commander of the Indian Armed Forces. The president is referred to as the first citizen of India. Although vested with these powers by the Constitution of India, the position is largely a ceremonial one and executive powers are de facto exercised by the prime minister.

The president is elected by the Electoral College composed of elected members of the parliament houses, the Lok Sabha and the Rajya Sabha, and also members of the Saasana Sabha or Vidhan Sabha, the state legislative assemblies. Presidents may remain in office for a tenure of five years, as stated by article 56, part V, of the Constitution of India. In the case where a president's term of office is terminated early or during the absence of the president, the vice president assumes office. By article 70 of part V, the parliament may decide how to discharge the functions of the president where this is not possible, or in any other unexpected contingency.

There have been 15 presidents of India since the post was established when India was declared as a republic with the adoption of the Indian constitution in 1950. Apart from these fifteen , three acting presidents have also been in office for short periods of time. Varahagiri Venkata Giri became the acting president in 1969 after Zakir Husain, died in office. Giri was elected president a few months later. He remains the only person to have held office both as a president and acting president. Rajendra Prasad, the first president of India, is the only person to have held office for two terms.

Seven presidents have been members of a political party before being elected. Six of these were active party members of the Indian National Congress. The Janata Party has had one member, Neelam Sanjiva Reddy, who later became president. Two presidents, Zakir Husain and Fakhruddin Ali Ahmed, have died in office. Their vice presidents served as acting presidents until a new president was elected. Following Zakir Husain's death, two acting presidents held office until the new president, Varahagiri Venkata Giri, was elected. When Giri resigned to take part in the presidential elections, he was succeeded by M. Hidayatullah as acting president. The 12th president, Pratibha Devisingh Patil, is the first woman to hold the office, elected in 2007.

On 25 July 2022, Droupadi Murmu took office as the 15th president of India, becoming the second woman and the first tribal person to hold the office.

List
This list is numbered based on presidents elected after winning an Indian presidential election. The terms of Varahagiri Venkata Giri, M. Hidayatullah and B. D. Jatti, who served as acting president are therefore not numbered or counted as actual terms in office. The president of India does not represent any political party. The colors used in the table indicate the following:

Legend

Key
  Resigned
  Died in office

Statistics

Timeline

See also
 President of India
 Vice President of India
 Prime Minister of India
 List of vice presidents of India
 List of prime ministers of India
 List of heads of state and government of Indian origin

Citations

External links
 World Statesmen – India
 Rulers.org – India

References

 
 

 
India government-related lists
Lists of political office-holders in India
India